Chicken Creek, alternate name Black Chicken Creek is a stream in the U.S. state of South Dakota.

Some say Chicken Creek received its name for the fact chickens were raised in the area, while others believe pioneers erroneously called partridges, native to the area, chickens.

See also
List of rivers of South Dakota

References

Rivers of Lawrence County, South Dakota
Rivers of South Dakota